The Jaycees English Medium School (or JEMS), is a school in Karkala in the state of Karnataka, India, which was founded in 1980 by the Karkala Junior Chamber under the leadership of K. P. Shenoy. The school was first of its kind to introduce English as a medium of instruction in the Taluk.

It started off in leased premises at the Sri Ananthashayana Temple. However, as the school grew, there were sufficient funds created to construct its own building. The new building formed near Swaraj Maidan on a hill which hosts a view of Bahubali statue and Chathurmukha Basathi on the banks of Ramasamudra.

The school also gives importance for sports and other co-curricular along with studies.

Schools in Udupi district
Educational institutions established in 1980
1980 establishments in Karnataka